Laney may refer to:

Laney (surname)
Laney, Georgia, U.S.
Laney, Wisconsin, U.S.
Emsley A. Laney High School, a high school near Wilmington, North Carolina
Lucy Craft Laney High School. a high school in  Augusta, Georgia.
Laney College, a community college in Oakland, California
Laney Amplification, a British brand of guitar amplifiers and cabinets
Laney, County Antrim, a townland in County Antrim, Northern Ireland

People
Laney Stewart (born 1966), American musician
Laney Jones (born 1991), American Singer, songwriter
Benjamin Travis Laney Jr. (1896-1977), American politician, governor of Arkansas

See also
 Layne
 Lany (disambiguation)
 Lainey (disambiguation)
 Lainie, a given name